Sitaleki Akauola (born 7 April 1992) is a Tongan international rugby league footballer who plays as a  for the Toulouse Olympique in the Betfred Championship.

He previously played for the Wests Tigers and the Penrith Panthers in the NRL. Akauola has also played for the Warrington Wolves in the Super League, and spent time on loan from Warrington at the Rochdale Hornets in the Championship.

Background
Akauola was born in Manurewa, New Zealand to parents Siupeli and Christina.  

He played his junior rugby league for the Manurewa Marlins, and was in the New Zealand Warriors junior system before being signed by the Wests Tigers.

Playing career

Wests Tigers
In 2012, Akauola played for the Wests Tigers' NYC team. "The Auckland Rugby League from New Zealand got me a trial with the Tigers out in Campbelltown. Two weeks after that I had a trial with NYC," he said. He played from the bench and set up two tries as the Wests Tigers won the 2012 NYC Grand Final.

In Round 5 of the 2013 NRL season, Akauola made his NRL debut for the Wests Tigers against the Melbourne Storm. It would be his only appearance for the season.

On 29 July 2014, Akauola re-signed with the Wests Tigers on a two-year contract. Mid-season, he played a string of games from the bench and in the second row. Towards the end of the season, he played four games on the wing, showing his versatility.

Penrith Panthers
Akauola signed a contract with the Penrith Panthers in September 2015, after not playing any first grade games with the Tigers that year.

In 2017, Akauola featured in both the Penrith NRL and NSW Cup squads. Akauola was a part of Penrith's 2017 NSW Cup Championship team, and the 2017 State Championship team, helping defeat the Wyong Roos and Papua New Guinea Hunters respectively.

Warrington Wolves
In August 2017, Akauola signed a two-year contract with the Warrington Wolves starting in 2018.

He played in the 2019 Challenge Cup Final victory over St. Helens at Wembley Stadium.

Salford Red Devils
On 23 Oct 2021 it was reported that he had signed for Salford Red Devils in the Super League

References

External links

Warrington Wolves profile
Penrith Panthers profile
SL profile

1992 births
Living people
Balmain Ryde-Eastwood Tigers players
Manurewa Marlins players
New Zealand expatriate sportspeople in England
New Zealand rugby league players
New Zealand sportspeople of Tongan descent
Penrith Panthers players
Rochdale Hornets players
Rugby league players from Auckland
Rugby league second-rows
Rugby league wingers
Salford Red Devils players
Tonga national rugby league team players
Toulouse Olympique players
Warrington Wolves players
Wests Tigers NSW Cup players
Wests Tigers players